Influenza A virus subtype H6N1 (A/H6N1), is a subtype of the influenza A virus. It has only infected one person, a woman in Taiwan, who recovered. Known to infect Eurasian teal, it is closely related to subtype H5N1.

References

Bird diseases
H6N1